PPDS may refer to:

 Personal Printer Data Stream, a computer printer language
 Partito Progressista Democratico Sammarinese or Sammarinese Democratic Progressive Party, a political party in San Marino
 Područja od posebne državne skrbi or Areas of Special State Concern, a Croatian government designation for regional development
 Philips Professional Display Solutions trademark name of TPV for the sales of professional Philips displays